The Canoe Sailing World Championships is an international competition in canoe sailing, sanctioned by the ICF as the premier event in that discipline.

The competition was first held in 1961 and has been held roughly every 3 years since. British Robin Wood has won the championships a record 4 times

Medalists

See also 
 International Canoe Federation

References

Canoe sailing